Reang Kesei is a khum (commune) of Sangkae District in Battambang Province in north-western Cambodia.

Villages

 Tuol Snuol
 Voat Kandal
 Reang Kesei
 Reang Kraol
 Prey Svay
 Svay Cheat
 Boeng Veaeng
 Damnak Dangkao
 Kakaoh Kambot

References

Communes of Battambang province
Sangkae District